The Revolutionary Internationalist Organization (RIO) is a German trotskyist organization. Its origins lie in Independent Revolution or iRevo, a tendency within the youth organization REVOLUTION, consisting of the sections in Germany, Switzerland, the Czech Republic and Australia. They left REVOLUTION in 2007, refusing to remain affiliated to the League for the Fifth International, forming a separate international of youth organisations while keeping the REVOLUTION name. The Australian section soon became inactive.

In 2009 iRevo members joined the New Left Anti-Capitalist Party of the Czech Republic, but were expelled because of differences with the party leadership. In that year they completely abandoned REVOLUTION and in January 2010 they founded their own organization under the name of Revolutionary Internationalist Organization (RIO), at the same time that they decided to promote a larger Trotskyist organization due to what they considered to be programmatic limits with respect to the orientation of REVOLUTION for its emphasis on purely student work.

RIO was thus born as a trinational organization having a presence in Germany, Switzerland and the Czech Republic, although over time these two branches would merge with that of Germany; likewise, its members participated in demonstrations and student strikes during 2009 and 2010. It is in this context that RIO would come into contact with the magazine Internationaler Klassenkampf (International Class Struggle) close to the Trotskyist Fraction - Fourth International (TF-FI) and begin an approach that would lead it to have greater agreement with that tendency. After a prolonged period of discussion, in August 2011, RIO would attend the TF-FI Conference held that year in Buenos Aires, where it would be admitted as a sympathising section; two years later, it would be added as a full section.

Currently the RIO has a presence in Berlin and Munich, has participated in mobilizations against racism and the advance of the far-right in Germany, it supports the struggle for the self-determination of Kurdistan and promotes the digital newspaper Klasse Gegen Klasse (Class against Class) in German and with a sub-portal in Turkish.

References

External links
old website of the Revolutionary Internationalist Organization (RIO)
RIO news website
RIO Facebook page
RIO news twitter

Germany
Trotskyist organisations in Germany